Events in the year 2019 in Uganda.

Incumbents

 President: Yoweri Museveni
 Vice President: Edward Ssekandi
 Prime Minister: Ruhakana Rugunda

Events

Deaths

1 January – Stephen Twinoburyo, mathematician (b. 1970).

10 March – Christine Alalo, police officer and peacekeeper (b. 1970).

21 March – Franco Wanyama, boxer (b. 1968)

References

 
2010s in Uganda 
Years of the 21st century in Uganda 
Uganda 
Uganda